Marius Sadoveac (born 7 May 1985) is a Romanian handballer who plays for SCM Politehnica Timișoara and the Romania national team.

Achievements
Liga Națională: 
Gold Medalist: 2009, 2010, 2011, 2012, 2013, 2014, 2015
Cupa României:
Winner: 2011, 2012, 2013, 2014, 2015
EHF Cup:
Fourth Place: 2014

References

1985 births
Living people
Sportspeople from Timișoara
Romanian male handball players
Romanian expatriates in France
Expatriate handball players 
HC Dobrogea Sud Constanța players